Naradan is a 2022 Indian Malayalam-language neo-noir psychological thriller film directed by Aashiq Abu starring Tovino Thomas, Anna Ben and Sharafudheen in main roles.

The film was originally scheduled to be released in April 2021, but was postponed due to the second wave of COVID-19 pandemic in India. After multiple postponements , the film was theatrically released on 3 March 2022 along with Bheeshma Parvam.

Plot 
Chandraprakash, an upcoming journalist working with the channel News Malayalam, is a talk show host and television news anchor with a huge audience appeal. Chandraprakash is under pressure for doing stories that increase the channel's rating from his editor and bosses. When a fellow journalist, Pradeep does a new story and lands a job at News Malayalam, Chandraprakash keeps aside his own moral principles and focuses on being number one. Chandraprakash meets a politician, Babuji, who offers him a chance to start a new channel, Narada News. Investors seeking new revenue streams invest in Chandraprakash. He becomes a kingmaker through Narada, an influential person who is able to provoke social violence. Chandraprakash uses his strategy of fabricated and half-baked stories to meet his ends, beginning the channel with a sting operation on the Minister of Forests, Thomman Varghese. However, things change when a social media celebrity Mudiyan asks some questions to Chandraprakash in a lift, after which he posts the video on social media which led to many trolls. Chandraprakash fabricates a narcotic report against Mudiyan. Since he is innocent, Adv. Shaakira Mohammed meets him and decides to fight against Chandraprakash. Shaakira reveals all the illegal activities Chandraprakash has done to increase TRP in front of the court, which leads to Chandraprakash being arrested and sent to prison.

Cast

Music

Songs
The soundtrack features songs composed  by Sekhar Menon. The Song Thannatthaan was Co-composed by Fejo and Manchild. Rex Vijayan played guitar for Thannatthan.

Original soundtrack
The original soundtrack is composed and produced by Yakzan Gary Pereira and Neha Nair.

Production
The film was announced in October 2020. Principal photography began on 25 January 2021. The film's shoot was wrapped up on 12 March 2021.

Release
The film was originally scheduled to be released in April 2021, but was postponed due to the second wave of COVID-19 pandemic in India. The film was later scheduled to release on 27 January 2022, but then postponed due to spreading of Omicron.
The film was then released on 3 March 2022 along with Mammootty starrer Bheeshma Parvam.

Reception
Naaradan received generally positive reviews from critics and audience. Bollywood Life gave 4.5/5 and wrote "Tovino Thomas and Anna Ben deliver the most stinging MASTERPIECE on TRP-hungry journalism".  Times of India gave 3.5/5 and wrote "A closer look at TRP chasing newsrooms". Firstpost gave 3.5/5 and wrote "Tovino Thomas, Anna Ben land a slap on the face of India’s fake-news-peddling media". The News Minute gave 3.5/5 and wrote "Tovino-Aashiq Abu film shows reality of new age journalism". Indian Express gave 3.5/5 and wrote "Tovino-Aashiq Abu film shows reality of new age journalism". Pinkvilla gave 3/5 and wrote "Tovino Thomas shines on screen as a news reporter in this thrilling story". Ottplay gave 3/5 and wrote "Tovino Thomas' anti-hero act makes Aashiq Abu's slow-burning thriller gripping". Behindwoods gave 2.75 and wrote "Naaradan keeps you hooked with a tight screenplay on modern-day journalism".

References

External links 
 

Indian thriller films
Indian sequel films
2020s Malayalam-language films
2022 thriller films